Nunor Bora, also known as Nungora, Nunor Fita, Nuner Bora, Lobonor Fita, and Lobonor Bora is a savoury rice flour snack made of onions and ginger. Usually, turmeric is added, and gives the snack a golden appearance. In Bangladesh, it is also sometimes called Nuniya Pitha. It is a traditional and a popular Pitha in Sylhet. It is often eaten as a snack, with tea, and is very popular at Eid.

Ingredients 
Onions, ginger, salt, turmeric, panch puran (optional), rice flour, ground rice, chopped coriander (optional) and water.

Method 

Nunor Bora are made by adding blended onion, ginger, and garlic to a large saucepan of boiling water, alongside some salt and turmeric powder. Sometimes, ground panch puran is added to enhance the taste and aroma.

A combination of plain flour, rice flour and/or ground rice is added to the saucepan, forming a spongy soft paste. When the paste is fully cooked, it is removed from the saucepan and left to cool. The paste is mixed into a dough, which is usually shaped into a ball. This ball of dough is flattened to make bread. The bread is cut up into smaller pieces, sometimes in a variety of different shapes. These pieces are either stored for later usage, or deep friend in oil to make edible rice cakes. These are the Nunor Bora.

See also 
 Pitha
 Bangladeshi cuisine

References 

Sylheti cuisine
Courses (food)
Pitha